Illilouette Fall is a  waterfall on the Illilouette Creek tributary of the Merced River in Yosemite National Park. It is located in a small canyon that cuts into the south wall of Yosemite Valley directly across from Vernal Fall. The origin and meaning of the waterfall's name has been lost to time.

The fall is prominently visible to the south from both Mist Trail and John Muir Trail near Vernal Fall. However, during low-flow months, the fall can disappear entirely from this perspective. The best vantage point for viewing the waterfall is from the Panorama Trail as it descends from Glacier Point. There is no trail to the base of the fall, as the narrow canyon is craggy and inundated with rapids during the wet season. It is possible - though not encouraged - to reach the base of the fall during low-flow months.

Name
The meaning of the name "Illilouette" is not known. According to Lafayette Bunnell, the Ahwahneechee name of the waterfall was "Too-lool-lo-we-ak". It was suggested by Bunnell that its literal translation was not appropriate for everyday use; what that translation was has been lost to time. "Illilouette" may have been a perversion of the waterfall's Ahwahneechee name, though this is not known with any certainty.

See also
Nevada Fall
Bridalveil Fall

References

External links

Waterfalls of Yosemite National Park
Merced River
Horsetail waterfalls
Waterfalls of Mariposa County, California